The 1989–90 Philadelphia Flyers season was the Philadelphia Flyers 23rd season in the National Hockey League (NHL). The Flyers missed the playoffs for the first time since the 1971–72 season and only the third time in franchise history.

Regular season
The 1989–90 season was one of the most turbulent in franchise history.

Goaltender Ron Hextall had to sit out the first 12-games of the schedule, sentenced after cementing his folk-hero status in the city by crowning Chris Chelios in the waning minutes of Game 6 of the Wales Conference Finals in May. Unfortunately, the layoff plus contract disputes cost him practice time in training camp, and he was felled by groin injuries three separate times during the season.

An ugly 1–6–1 start was reversed despite injuries to Hextall, Brian Propp, Tim Kerr, Mark Howe and others with the team atop the weakened Patrick Division after a win in Montreal just before Christmas.

Little used Tony Horacek posted a hat trick in a 6–3 win in Los Angeles over the Kings on December 30, but the team suffered through a dismal 10-game winless stretch thereafter (0–7–3) from December 31 through January 23. Previous inconsistent play plus the slide cost Dave Poulin his captaincy on December 15, then forced his trade to Boston for former Flyer Ken Linseman. The move did not work, and despite breaking the skid with an 8–6 win against the Jets, Holmgren accused his club of quitting during a 7–2 loss at Washington on January 28 - a defeat which put them three points behind the Capitals in last place.

Newly acquired back-up Pete Peeters had his only season highlight with a 3–0 shutout over Toronto on February 15, but he finished the season 1–13–5. On February 28 in Vancouver, the team was lucky to pull out a 7–7 tie after blowing a 5–2 first-period lead. In the interim, Wells was dealt to the Sabres for unknown winger and future NHL referee Kevin Maguire.

Following an inspired win in Calgary on March 1, Propp was traded to the Bruins, and a four-goal game by Mark Messier in a 5–3 loss to Edmonton two days later triggered a four-game losing streak. The nadir of the late-season collapse came on March 17 in Quebec, as the Flyers allowed three third-period goals to drop a 6–3 decision to the Nordiques (who went on to win all of 12 games that year). Inexplicably, with the Islanders and Penguins also taking late-season dives, the Flyers were still alive for the final playoff spot in the division.

A 5–3 home win over Pittsburgh on March 22 got the team within one point of fourth, but they limped to the end of the schedule with an 0–3–2 record. A 6–2 road loss to the Islanders on March 31 eliminated them from the postseason.

It marked the first time in franchise history that the team finished in last place in any division since its 1967 inception.

Among the bright spots, Tocchet led the team with 37 goals and 96 points. Seven players scored 20-or-more goals. Kerr was limited to 40 games but managed 24 goals and 48 points.

General manager Bob Clarke, having been with the Flyers organization since he was drafted in 1969, was fired on April 16.

Season standings

Schedule and results

Regular season

|- style="background:#fcf;"
| 1 || October 5 || New Jersey Devils || 2–6 || 0–1–0 || 0 || 
|- style="background:#fcf;"
| 2 || October 6 || @ Washington Capitals || 3–5 || 0–2–0 || 0 || 
|- style="background:#fcf;"
| 3 || October 8 || @ Winnipeg Jets || 3–5 || 0–3–0 || 0 || 
|- style="background:#cfc;"
| 4 || October 12 || Quebec Nordiques || 4–2 || 1–3–0 || 2 || 
|- style="background:#ffc;"
| 5 || October 14 || @ New York Islanders || 3–3 OT || 1–3–1 || 3 || 
|- style="background:#fcf;"
| 6 || October 15 || Calgary Flames || 2–3 || 1–4–1 || 3 || 
|- style="background:#fcf;"
| 7 || October 18 || @ New Jersey Devils || 3–5 || 1–5–1 || 3 || 
|- style="background:#fcf;"
| 8 || October 21 || New York Rangers || 1–3 || 1–6–1 || 3 || 
|- style="background:#cfc;"
| 9 || October 24 || St. Louis Blues || 6–1 || 2–6–1 || 5 || 
|- style="background:#fcf;"
| 10 || October 28 || @ Minnesota North Stars || 5–6 || 2–7–1 || 5 || 
|- style="background:#cfc;"
| 11 || October 30 || @ New York Rangers || 3–1 || 3–7–1 || 7 || 
|-

|- style="background:#ffc;"
| 12 || November 1 || @ Detroit Red Wings || 5–5 OT || 3–7–2 || 8 || 
|- style="background:#cfc;"
| 13 || November 4 || @ Toronto Maple Leafs || 7–4 || 4–7–2 || 10 || 
|- style="background:#cfc;"
| 14 || November 5 || New York Islanders || 3–2 || 5–7–2 || 12 || 
|- style="background:#fcf;"
| 15 || November 9 || Toronto Maple Leafs || 1–4 || 5–8–2 || 12 || 
|- style="background:#cfc;"
| 16 || November 11 || @ New Jersey Devils || 7–5 || 6–8–2 || 14 || 
|- style="background:#ffc;"
| 17 || November 12 || New Jersey Devils || 3–3 OT || 6–8–3 || 15 || 
|- style="background:#cfc;"
| 18 || November 14 || @ New York Islanders || 5–4 || 7–8–3 || 17 || 
|- style="background:#cfc;"
| 19 || November 16 || Minnesota North Stars || 6–3 || 8–8–3 || 19 || 
|- style="background:#fcf;"
| 20 || November 18 || Winnipeg Jets || 0–1 OT || 8–9–3 || 19 || 
|- style="background:#cfc;"
| 21 || November 22 || Montreal Canadiens || 5–1 || 9–9–3 || 21 || 
|- style="background:#cfc;"
| 22 || November 24 || Edmonton Oilers || 5–1 || 10–9–3 || 23 || 
|- style="background:#fcf;"
| 23 || November 25 || @ Hartford Whalers || 2–5 || 10–10–3 || 23 || 
|- style="background:#cfc;"
| 24 || November 28 || @ Pittsburgh Penguins || 6–3 || 11–10–3 || 25 || 
|- style="background:#cfc;"
| 25 || November 30 || Pittsburgh Penguins || 4–1 || 12–10–3 || 27 || 
|-

|- style="background:#cfc;"
| 26 || December 1 || @ Washington Capitals || 3–2 || 13–10–3 || 29 || 
|- style="background:#fcf;"
| 27 || December 3 || Boston Bruins || 1–2 || 13–11–3 || 29 || 
|- style="background:#fcf;"
| 28 || December 5 || Washington Capitals || 3–4 || 13–12–3 || 29 || 
|- style="background:#cfc;"
| 29 || December 7 || Buffalo Sabres || 4–3 OT || 14–12–3 || 31 || 
|- style="background:#ffc;"
| 30 || December 9 || @ Quebec Nordiques || 6–6 OT || 14–12–4 || 32 || 
|- style="background:#cfc;"
| 31 || December 10 || @ New York Rangers || 4–2 || 15–12–4 || 34 || 
|- style="background:#fcf;"
| 32 || December 14 || Hartford Whalers || 2–3 || 15–13–4 || 34 || 
|- style="background:#cfc;"
| 33 || December 16 || Los Angeles Kings || 5–2 || 16–13–4 || 36 || 
|- style="background:#fcf;"
| 34 || December 17 || @ Buffalo Sabres || 3–4 || 16–14–4 || 36 || 
|- style="background:#fcf;"
| 35 || December 19 || Washington Capitals || 1–2 || 16–15–4 || 36 || 
|- style="background:#fcf;"
| 36 || December 22 || New Jersey Devils || 4–5 OT || 16–16–4 || 36 || 
|- style="background:#cfc;"
| 37 || December 23 || @ Montreal Canadiens || 5–3 || 17–16–4 || 38 || 
|- style="background:#fcf;"
| 38 || December 27 || @ Edmonton Oilers || 1–2 || 17–17–4 || 38 || 
|- style="background:#cfc;"
| 39 || December 30 || @ Los Angeles Kings || 6–3 || 18–17–4 || 40 || 
|- style="background:#ffc;"
| 40 || December 31 || @ Vancouver Canucks || 2–2 OT || 18–17–5 || 41 || 
|-

|- style="background:#ffc;"
| 41 || January 2 || @ Calgary Flames || 4–4 OT || 18–17–6 || 42 || 
|- style="background:#fcf;"
| 42 || January 4 || @ St. Louis Blues || 4–5 OT || 18–18–6 || 42 || 
|- style="background:#fcf;"
| 43 || January 6 || @ Chicago Blackhawks || 5–8 || 18–19–6 || 42 || 
|- style="background:#fcf;"
| 44 || January 11 || Chicago Blackhawks || 4–5 || 18–20–6 || 42 || 
|- style="background:#ffc;"
| 45 || January 13 || @ Montreal Canadiens || 2–2 OT || 18–20–7 || 43 || 
|- style="background:#fcf;"
| 46 || January 14 || @ New York Rangers || 3–4 OT || 18–21–7 || 43 || 
|- style="background:#fcf;"
| 47 || January 16 || @ Pittsburgh Penguins || 3–4 || 18–22–7 || 43 || 
|- style="background:#fcf;"
| 48 || January 18 || Vancouver Canucks || 2–3 OT || 18–23–7 || 43 || 
|- style="background:#fcf;"
| 49 || January 23 || Buffalo Sabres || 2–3 || 18–24–7 || 43 || 
|- style="background:#cfc;"
| 50 || January 25 || Winnipeg Jets || 8–6 || 19–24–7 || 45 || 
|- style="background:#fcf;"
| 51 || January 27 || @ Boston Bruins || 1–2 || 19–25–7 || 45 || 
|- style="background:#fcf;"
| 52 || January 28 || @ Washington Capitals || 2–7 || 19–26–7 || 45 || 
|- style="background:#cfc;"
| 53 || January 30 || @ Pittsburgh Penguins || 6–3 || 20–26–7 || 47 || 
|-

|- style="background:#cfc;"
| 54 || February 1 || Hartford Whalers || 2–1 || 21–26–7 || 49 || 
|- style="background:#cfc;"
| 55 || February 3 || Minnesota North Stars || 7–6 OT || 22–26–7 || 51 || 
|- style="background:#ffc;"
| 56 || February 8 || New York Islanders || 5–5 OT || 22–26–8 || 52 || 
|- style="background:#fcf;"
| 57 || February 11 || Pittsburgh Penguins || 1–4 || 22–27–8 || 52 || 
|- style="background:#fcf;"
| 58 || February 13 || New York Rangers || 3–4 || 22–28–8 || 52 || 
|- style="background:#cfc;"
| 59 || February 15 || Toronto Maple Leafs || 3–0 || 23–28–8 || 54 || 
|- style="background:#fcf;"
| 60 || February 16 || @ Detroit Red Wings || 6–9 || 23–29–8 || 54 || 
|- style="background:#cfc;"
| 61 || February 18 || New York Islanders || 3–2 || 24–29–8 || 56 || 
|- style="background:#fcf;"
| 62 || February 20 || @ Pittsburgh Penguins || 4–6 || 24–30–8 || 56 || 
|- style="background:#cfc;"
| 63 || February 22 || @ St. Louis Blues || 7–4 || 25–30–8 || 58 || 
|- style="background:#fcf;"
| 64 || February 25 || @ Chicago Blackhawks || 1–4 || 25–31–8 || 58 || 
|- style="background:#ffc;"
| 65 || February 28 || @ Vancouver Canucks || 7–7 OT || 25–31–9 || 59 || 
|-

|- style="background:#cfc;"
| 66 || March 1 || @ Calgary Flames || 4–2 || 26–31–9 || 61 || 
|- style="background:#fcf;"
| 67 || March 3 || @ Edmonton Oilers || 3–5 || 26–32–9 || 61 || 
|- style="background:#fcf;"
| 68 || March 6 || Boston Bruins || 1–2 || 26–33–9 || 61 || 
|- style="background:#fcf;"
| 69 || March 8 || New York Rangers || 5–7 || 26–34–9 || 61 || 
|- style="background:#fcf;"
| 70 || March 10 || Washington Capitals || 3–4 || 26–35–9 || 61 || 
|- style="background:#cfc;"
| 71 || March 15 || New York Islanders || 5–4 || 27–35–9 || 63 || 
|- style="background:#fcf;"
| 72 || March 17 || @ Quebec Nordiques || 3–6 || 27–36–9 || 63 || 
|- style="background:#cfc;"
| 73 || March 18 || Los Angeles Kings || 7–4 || 28–36–9 || 65 || 
|- style="background:#cfc;"
| 74 || March 20 || @ New Jersey Devils || 3–2 || 29–36–9 || 67 || 
|- style="background:#cfc;"
| 75 || March 22 || Pittsburgh Penguins || 5–3 || 30–36–9 || 69 || 
|- style="background:#fcf;"
| 76 || March 24 || New Jersey Devils || 2–5 || 30–37–9 || 69 || 
|- style="background:#fcf;"
| 77 || March 25 || @ New York Rangers || 3–7 || 30–38–9 || 69 || 
|- style="background:#ffc;"
| 78 || March 29 || Washington Capitals || 2–2 OT || 30–38–10 || 70 || 
|- style="background:#fcf;"
| 79 || March 31 || @ New York Islanders || 2–6 || 30–39–10 || 70 || 
|-

|- style="background:#ffc;"
| 80 || April 1 || Detroit Red Wings || 3–3 OT || 30–39–11 || 71 || 
|-

|-
|Legend:

Player statistics

Scoring
 Position abbreviations: C = Center; D = Defense; G = Goaltender; LW = Left Wing; RW = Right Wing
  = Joined team via a transaction (e.g., trade, waivers, signing) during the season. Stats reflect time with the Flyers only.
  = Left team via a transaction (e.g., trade, waivers, release) during the season. Stats reflect time with the Flyers only.

Goaltending

Awards and records

Awards

Records

Among the team records set during the 1989–90 season was Rick Tocchet tying the team record for most goals in a regular season game (4) on January 25. The Flyers team record 17 consecutive playoff appearances streak ended with their failure to qualify for the 1990 Stanley Cup playoffs.

Transactions
The Flyers were involved in the following transactions from May 26, 1989, the day after the deciding game of the 1989 Stanley Cup Finals, through May 24, 1990, the day of the deciding game of the 1990 Stanley Cup Finals.

Trades

Players acquired

Players lost

Signings

Draft picks

NHL Entry Draft
Philadelphia's picks at the 1989 NHL Entry Draft, which was held at the Met Center in Bloomington, Minnesota, on June 17, 1989. The Flyers' first-round pick, 12th overall, was traded to the Toronto Maple Leafs along with the Calgary Flames' first-round pick, 21st overall, for Ken Wregget on March 6, 1989. They also traded their third-round pick, 54th overall, and Greg Smyth to the Quebec Nordiques for Terry Carkner on July 25, 1988, their fourth-round pick, 75th overall, to the Minnesota North Stars for Gordie Roberts on February 9, 1988, and their fifth-round pick, 96th overall, to the Toronto Maple Leafs for Al Secord on February 7, 1989.

NHL Supplemental Draft
Philadelphia's picks at the 1989 NHL Supplemental Draft.

Farm teams
The Flyers were affiliated with the Hershey Bears of the AHL.

Notes

References
General
 
 
 
Specific

1989–90 NHL season by team
1989–90 in American ice hockey by team
1989
Philadelphia
Philadelphia